The Cornwall Comets is a Quebec Senior AA Hockey League (LHSPAA) team based in Cornwall, Ontario, Canada, who play at the Ed Lumley Arena inside the Cornwall Civic Complex.

2004-05: The Inaugural Season
The franchise was granted to Joel LaPalme of Cornwall, Ontario in Winter of 2004, and the team's play began in September 2004. Their first game in history was in Sainte-Tite, Quebec against "Les Mustangs de Saint-Tite", on October 1, 2004 which they lost 4-2. Their first home game was Saturday, October 9, 2004, an 8-2 loss against the Laval Rebels. Their first win in history was a 6-5 OT winner against their eventual arch-rivals St Jean Aigles (now Saint-Jean Chiefs of the LNAH) in Saint-Jean-sur-Richelieu, Quebec.

The turning point for the Comets was on November 27, 2004 when they won 5-3 against St. Jean, and began a 9-game winning streak.

They made the playoffs and swept the Soulanges Pirates 3 games to None. In round 2 they beat Saint-Jean in 5 games with the series at 3-2 to go to the Championship finals against Louiseville Canadel. However they lost to the Canadel in Game 7.

2005-06: The Championship Season
After a successful inaugural season, the Comets were back for a second season. Their first game was an 8-7 win against St. Jean Aigles in Saint-Jean-sur-Richelieu, Quebec on September 16, 2005. They played their Home opener the next night at the Cornwall Civic Complex, a 5-2 win over the Soulanges Pirates. Their longest winning streak was from November 12 to December 29, with an 11-game winning streak.

At the beginning of the season, the League had 8 teams. By the playoffs, there were only 4. The Comets beat "Les Marquis de Sagueney" in 7 Games of the first round, and advanced into the Finals for the 2nd year in a row. Their opponents were their arch-rivals, St. Jean.

The 1st game of the series was in St. Jean, and the Comets won by a score of 3-1. Game 2 in St. Jean was 5-3 for the Comets, with Cornwall leading the series 2-0 heading back to the Complex. Game 3 was a 4-3 win for the Comets in front of a nearly sold-out loud and pumped up home crowd. Word had spread all over the City of Cornwall that their team was just 1 win away from capturing the championship, and tickets sold out very fast. Game 4 was a 4000-plus Saturday night crowd ready to see the Comets win the title. The score ended up a 6-3 win for the Champion Cornwall Comets. Comets fan favourite and tough-guy Pat Allard won his 1st championship.

Now that the Comets won the Championship, the off-ice drama in the city of Cornwall began.

The end of the League
The Aigles moved up into the LNAH, and the Canadel folded, so the LHSPAA suspended operations for the 2006-07 season, which left the Comets without a league to play in. The team then moved to Cowansville Que. to play in another semi pro league for 1 yr. Then disbanded.

Ice hockey teams in Ontario
Sport in Cornwall, Ontario
2004 establishments in Ontario
Ice hockey clubs established in 2004